The Chicago Sockers were an American soccer team that were founded in 1995 as the Chicago Stingers. The team was a member of the United Soccer Leagues (USL) and played at the professional level in the USISL Pro League, USISL Select League and USISL D-3 Pro League until 1999.  The club was renamed Sockers and choose to be relegated to the amateur USL Premier Development League (PDL), the fourth tier of the American soccer pyramid, for the 1999 season.

The Sockers were one of the most successful amateur teams in the late 1990s, winning three national titles including back-to-back PDL Championships in 1999 and 2000, reaching two divisional playoffs, and getting to both the quarterfinal and semifinal of the US Open Cup prior to 2000. Following the 2000 season, despite being reigning PDL Champions, the Sockers folded. However, the club survives as a youth soccer organization under the same name.

The Sockers played their home games at Olympic Park in the village of Schaumburg, Illinois, a suburb of Chicago. The team's colors were blue and white.

History

The Chicago Stingers were founded in 1995 as a professional club to play in the USL. The club played in various transitional professional leagues in the USL, including the USISL Pro League, USISL Select League and USISL D-3 Pro League, which at the time represented the second or third tier of professional soccer in the American soccer pyramid under Major League Soccer (MLS).

For the 1999 season, the club was renamed Chicago FC Sockers (or Chicago Sockers) and relegated itself to the amateur USL Premier Development League (PDL), considered the top national amateur league and the fourth tier in the pyramid. The Sockers had a very successful first season in the PDL, finishing second in the Great Lakes Division and defeating the Spokane Shadow 3–1 in the PDL Championship.

The Sockers were Champions again in 2000 after a move to the Heartland Division, finishing first in the regular season and defeating the Mid-Michigan Bucks 1–0 in the Championship final.

Youth programs

The Chicago Sockers is now a prominent youth soccer program, stationed in Palatine, Illinois. The program is ranked as the fifth best boys youth soccer program by both nationalsoccerranking.com and Soccer America. The Sockers play in the Northern Illinois Soccer League (NISL), U.S. Soccer Development Academy and the Elite Clubs National League (ECNL). The program has won several national championships and has sent several players to the US Men's National Team and top professional clubs in Major League Soccer and abroad. These players include Jonathan Spector, Michael Bradley, Jay DeMerit, Mike Magee, Will Johnson, Michael Stephens and Bryan Namoff.

Year-by-year

Coaches
 Bret Hall 1998–2000
David Richardson1986– present
Oleg Vatchev 2002–present
Ahmed R Gad 2001–present
Michael Richardson 1986–present
Nilton (Batata) DaSilva 1986–present
Leo Kulinczenko 2000–2006 / 2009–2016
Arthur Wyrot 1997–present

References

 
Soccer clubs in Chicago
Defunct Premier Development League teams
USISL teams
Soccer clubs in Illinois
1995 establishments in Illinois
2000 disestablishments in Illinois
Association football clubs established in 1995
Association football clubs disestablished in 2000
Schaumburg, Illinois